The Forests and Countryside Ordinance is a Hong Kong ordinance "to consolidate and amend the law relating to forests and plants, and to provide for the protection of the countryside".

Prohibited acts
Under the Ordinance, no people, without lawful authority or excuse are allowed to:

 cut grass, remove turf or earth, rake pine needles; 
 pluck or damage any bud, blossom, or leaf of any tree, shrub, or plant; 
 trespass or pasture cattle or goats or permit cattle or goats to trespass; 
 fell, cut, burn or otherwise destroy any trees or growing plants,

..in any forest (any area of Government land covered with selfgrown trees) or plantation (any area of Government land which has been planted with trees or shrubs or sown with the seeds of trees or shrubs) of Hong Kong.

Forestry Regulations Cap. 96A
Forestry Regulations Cap. 96A is a part of Forests and Countryside Ordinance Cap.96.
Under the regulations, it is illegal to sell, offer for sale, or have in one's possession or under one's custody or control any portion without legal excuse.

See also
 List of protected species in Hong Kong

References

External links
 Department of Justice: Bilingual Laws Information System

Environment of Hong Kong
Hong Kong legislation
Forest law